Rajathi is a given name. Notable people with the name include:

Rajathi, known by the stage name Indraja, Indian actress
Rajathi Kunchithapatham, Indian politician
Rajathi Salma (born 1968), Tamil writer, activist, and politician

See also
Rajathi Rojakili, Tamil film

Hindu given names
Indian feminine given names